Tricholomopsis bambusina is a species of Tricholomopsis from China and Japan.

Gallery

References

External links
 
 

bambusina